Mamokete Lechela (born 1 January 1982) is a Lesotho long-distance runner. She competed in the women's marathon at the 2004 Summer Olympics.

References

1982 births
Living people
Athletes (track and field) at the 2004 Summer Olympics
Lesotho female long-distance runners
Lesotho female marathon runners
Olympic athletes of Lesotho
Place of birth missing (living people)